Kutalmış  is a very rare masculine Turkish given name. "Kutalmış" is composed of two words: "kut" and "almış". In Turkish, "Kut" means "life force", and/or "happiness" whereas "almış" means literally "(he/she) received", and/or "(he/she) took". Thus, "Kutalmış" means "who received happines (divine)", ""who received life force (from god)". In Turkish mythology, "Kut" also means "divine authority or power that a person (kağan) has received (blessed) from god". In this interpretation, "Kutalmış" means, "The ruler who is blessed and authorized by god to be the ruler".

Given name 

 Seljuk Kutalmısh, the son of Arslan Yabgu and a cousin of Toğrül Bey (Toghrul Begh).
 Ahmet Kutalmış Türkeş, the son of Alparslan Türkeş and MP of Justice and Development Party.

Turkish masculine given names